Kurds in Iran constitute a large minority in the country with a population of around 9 and 10 million people.

Geography

Iranian Kurdistan or Eastern Kurdistan, refers to the parts of western Iran inhabited by Kurds which borders Iraq and Turkey. It includes the Kurdistan Province, Kermanshah Province, West Azerbaijan Province, Ilam Province, and Lorestan Province.

Shia Feyli Kurds inhabit Kermanshah Province, except for those parts where people are Jaff, and Ilam Province; as well as some parts of Kurdistan and Hamadan provinces. The Kurds of Khorasan, in the North Khorasan Province of northeastern Iran, are Shi'ite Muslims. The Lak tribe populate parts of Ilam Province and Lorestan Province, while Chegini Kurds reside in central Lorestan.

Religion

The two major religions among Kurds in Iran are Islam and Yarsanism, while fewer Kurds adhere to Baháʼí Faith and Judaism. There is disagreement on which is the largest denomination among Kurds; experts such as Richard N. Frye and Martin van Bruinessen argue that Sunni Islam (the Shafi'i branch) is the majority religion, while researcher Anu Leinonen believes it is the Twelver branch of Shia Islam.

Pockets of Sunni Kurds belong to the Qadiriyya tariqa (around Marivan and Sanandaj). These orders have experienced repression from the state, including the destruction of their places of worship. Yarsanis are also targeted by the central government.

Political history

Emergence of Kurdish nationalism 
While Ottoman Kurdistan has been identified as the source of Kurdish national inspiration, Iranian Kurdistan has been identified as the ideological cradle for the emergence of Kurdish nationalism.

In Iran, Kurdish intellectual writings and poetry from the 16th and 17th century indicate that the Kurdish population in the country was aware of the necessity of Kurdish unity and the need to form political and administrative entities for Kurds. However, these calls for Kurdish unity did not reach the broader Kurdish population until the 20th century when it awakened and diffused as a response to the implementation of nation-state policies (Persianization) by changing Iranian rulers. These policies not only alienated Kurds but also excluded them from equal access to citizenship. An example was the Constitutional Revolution of 1905–1911, which elevated Persian above Kurdish by asserting it as official language, language of administration and language of education.

Cross-border interaction (1918–1979) 
Kurds have a strong cross-border ethnic linkage and few historical Kurdish rebellions were limited to the borders of a single country. For example, the rebellion of Sheikh Ubeydullah in Turkish Kurdistan around 1880 inspired Simko Shikak to rebel in 1918, while the various Barzani rebellions in Iraqi Kurdistan became a source of support for the Republic of Mahabad. Other examples of cross-border interaction include the subjugation of the Simko Shikak revolt forcing Simko to flee to Rawandiz in Iraqi Kurdistan – where he sought the support of Sheikh Mahmud Barzanji. Following the fall of the Republic of Mahabad in 1946, some of its leaders also fled to Iraqi Kurdistan where they were sheltered by the son of Sheikh Mahmud Barzanji. Mustafa Barzani had also supported the Republic of Mahabad by sending 2,100 soldiers which in turn also increased Kurdish self-confidence. Many teachers and military officers from Iraqi Kurdistan moreover crossed the border to support the republic.

In 1944, the Society for the Revival of the Kurds/Kurdistan (JK) considered the first Kurdish nationalist movement met with a Turkish Kurdish delegation and an Iraqi Kurdish delegation at the border area near Mount Dalanpar where they signed the Pact of Three Borders which demonstrated the existence of a strong Kurdish sense of cross-border solidarity and sentiment.

Cross-border interaction became difficult to sustain in the 1950s due to repression from SAVAK on the Iranian side. However, Kurds were able to reinforce the cross-border political activity, when the First Iraqi–Kurdish War commenced in 1961, as the Democratic Party of Iranian Kurdistan (KDPI) gave financial support and loyalty to their counterpart in Iraq, the Kurdistan Democratic Party (KDP), while KDPI themselves accessed spatial resources. Relations between KDP and KDPI would later deteriorate greatly as KDP became a close ally of SAVAK against Iraq. CIA documents from 1963 show that the KDP rebuffed support from KDPI due to the desire to maintain close relations with Iran.

In the 1970s, KDPI with Komalah and the Patriotic Union of Kurdistan (PUK) fought around Piranshahr, Sardasht, Baneh in the northern parts of Iranian Kurdistan against Iranian forces who received support from KDP.

Cross-border interaction after 1979 
After the Iranian Revolution in 1979, political infighting among Kurds increased and KDPI and Komala fought over political and spatial influence in Iranian Kurdistan as they were fighting Iran together. In the 1980s, the two political and military groups had become powerful and cross-border interaction was therefore less important.

Separatism

Kurdish separatism in Iran or the Kurdish–Iranian conflict is an ongoing, long running, separatist dispute between the Kurdish opposition in Western Iran and the governments of Iran, lasting since the emergence of Reza Shah Pahlavi in 1918.

During the Iranian Revolution, Kurdish nationalist political parties were unsuccessful in attracting support, who at that time had no interest in autonomy. However, since the 1990s, Kurdish nationalism in the region has grown, partly due to outrage at the government's violent suppression of Kurdish activism.

Tribes

See also
 Ardalan
 Mokryan

References

Bibliography

Further reading
 
 

 
 
Ethnic groups in Iran
Iran
Iranian Kurdistan
People from Ilam Province
People from Lorestan Province
People from Kurdistan Province
People from Kermanshah Province
People from West Azerbaijan Province
Regions of Iran
Kurdish people